Johan Dahlberg (born February 3, 1987) is a Swedish professional ice hockey winger who played with Modo Hockey during the 2005–06 Elitserien season. He was selected by the Toronto Maple Leafs in the 6th round (173rd overall) of the 2005 NHL Entry Draft.

Career statistics

Regular season and playoffs

International

External links

Living people
Modo Hockey players
Toronto Maple Leafs draft picks
1987 births
Swedish ice hockey left wingers